BER Airport – Terminal 5 station (formerly named Berlin Schönefeld Airport station) is a railway station in Schönefeld next to the formerly independent Berlin Schönefeld Airport, which has now been re-branded as Terminal 5 of Berlin Brandenburg Airport, just outside Berlin. The station is on the Grünauer Kreuz–Berlin Brandenburg Airport railway and is served by S-Bahn lines S9 and S45. Since October 2020 the station has no longer been served by regional trains.

History

Schönefeld airport
Berlin-Schönefeld railway station was built within 150 days and opened for the public on 10 July 1951 as part of the Berliner Außenring. 
On 26 February 1962, an additional platform was added and Schönefeld was connected to the Berlin S-Bahn.

BER
On 25 October 2020, the station was renamed to "Flughafen BER – Terminal 5" to reflect the re-development of Schönefeld Airport into an operational terminal of Berlin Brandenburg Airport. A few days later all train services except the S-Bahn switched to the new Terminal 1 station.

Long distance services
From May to October 2020, Intercity 17 (Dresden-Berlin-Rostock/Warnemünde) stopped in Schönefeld. Since the opening of BER, it serves BER Airport – Terminal 1-2 station instead.

Shutdown of Terminal 5
Despite the shutdown of Terminal 5 in early 2021, the station continues to be served to the same extent as during Terminal 5's existence as a part of BER, as the Terminal now hosts a vaccination center for the administration of Covid 19 vaccines.

Train services
The station is served by the following services:

 Berlin S-Bahn services  Flughafen BER – Terminal 1–2 – Flughafen BER-Terminal 5 – Schöneweide – Neukölln – Südkreuz
 Berlin S-Bahn services  Spandau – Westkreuz – Hauptbahnhof – Alexanderplatz – Ostbahnhof – Schöneweide – Flughafen BER – Terminal 5 – Flughafen BER – Terminal 1–2

Until October 2020 it was also served by the following services which now call at terminals 1 and 2.

 Regional-Express  Dessau – Bad Belzig – Michendorf – Berlin – Flughafen BER-Terminal 5 – Wünsdorf-Waldstadt
 Regionalbahn  Nauen – Falkensee – Berlin – Flughafen BER-Terminal 5
 Regionalbahn  Berlin – Potsdam – Golm – Saarmund – Flughafen BER-Terminal 5 – Königs Wusterhausen

Gallery

See also 
BER Airport – Terminal 1-2 station

References 

 Jürgen Meyer-Kronthaler, Wolfgang Kramer: Berlins S-Bahnhöfe. Ein dreiviertel Jahrhundert. Berlin-Brandenburg 1999.  
 Bernd Kuhlmann: Eisenbahn-Größenwahn in Berlin. Die Planungen 1933 bis 1945 und deren Realisierung. GVE, Berlin 1996.

External links

Railway stations in Brandenburg
Berlin S-Bahn stations
Buildings and structures in Dahme-Spreewald
Railway stations in Germany opened in 1951
Airport railway stations in Germany